Samburu East is an electoral constituency in Kenya. It is one of three constituencies of Samburu County. The constituency was established for the 1966 elections. The constituency has four wards, all electing Members of the County Assembly for the Samburu County Government.

Members of Parliament

Wards

References

External links 
Samburu East Constituency

Constituencies in Samburu County
Constituencies in Rift Valley Province
1966 establishments in Kenya
Constituencies established in 1966